Sunday Reantaso (born Domingo Romero Reantaso; July 6, 1898 – May 1, 1948) was a Filipino-American actor, singer, comedian, and stage director who introduced vaudeville (later called "bodabil") to the Philippine audience in 1916. He migrated to Hawaii where he became a social welfare worker and a Filipino community leader.

Early life
Domingo Reantaso was born in Oas, Albay, the son of Estanislao "Wenceslao" Ranido Reantaso and Matea Rastryllo Romero. At the young age of 8, he was sent to New York City to be educated by the Catholic brothers of the Cathedral school of Manhattan.

He returned to Manila to graduate from the then-newly-formed University of the Philippines. Although he was a teacher by profession, he became acquainted with theatrical groups and ventured into the emerging local entertainment industry.

Theatrical career

In 1916, Reantaso started the first Filipino vaudeville company, the Philippine Vaudeville Stars. The troupe's performers include Amanding Montes, Katy de la Cruz, Max Felix, Rafael Cuyugan, and Reantaso himself. He eventually started other companies such as his namesake Sunday Reantaso & Co., the Savoy Nifties, the Variety Stars, the Filipino Supreme Vaudeville Company, the Revue of Revues, and the Manila Nifties. They sang, danced, and entertained Filipinos in the theaters of Manila like the Savoy, Lux, Zorrilla, and Rizal.

In 1927, the troupe traveled to Hawaii to perform but Reantaso subsequently stayed there.

Life in Hawaii
Reantaso worked as a boxing announcer and promoter for a few years. He was called the "Tex Rickard of Maui".

He became active in the Filipino community in Hawaii, holding several positions in organizations such as the Territorial Filipino Council, Timarau Club, Filipino Dramatic Club, and Kauai Filipino Club. He continued organizing entertainment events and festivities, even directing the mobile entertainment group of the United Service Organization.

In 1942, he was drafted into the military when the United States joined the war after the attack on Pearl Harbor. He was later promoted to Captain, then eventually to the rank of Major.

After 20 years of civic activity, he was granted American citizenship in June 1947.

Personal life and death
Reantaso was the eldest of his siblings Getulio "Uyong", Severino, Sesinando "Dandoy", Antonia "Tuning", and Beatrice "Bating". He had his first son (Alfredo "Fred") in Manila, and had four children (Andrew "Andy", Carmen, Marie Dominic "Ruth Ann", and Thomas) with his wife in Hawaii, Lucy Novite Silva.

On the night of Friday, April 30, 1948, Reantaso walked into Queen's hospital, asked the attendant to call his doctor, and then suddenly collapsed. He died at 3:30 am the next day.

See also
 Bodabil
 Luis Borromeo
 Katy de la Cruz
 Atang de la Rama
 Manila Grand Opera House
 Sakadas
 Filipinos in Hawaii

References 

Filipino male comedians
Filipino male stage actors
Vaudeville performers
People from Hawaii
1898 births
1948 deaths
People from Albay
20th-century Filipino male singers
Filipino expatriates in the United States